George Clay Hubback was an Anglican priest in the mid twentieth century.

Born on 7 April 1882 he was educated at Rossall School and Liverpool University and began his career as a Civil Engineer  before being ordained for the priesthood in 1910. After a curacy at St Anne's, South Lambeth he was with the Oxford Mission to India until 1924 when he became Bishop of Assam. In 1945 he was translated to Bishop of Calcutta and with it the title of Metropolitan of India. He retired in 1950 and died on  2 November 1955.

Notes

1882 births
1955 deaths
People educated at Rossall School
Alumni of the University of Liverpool
English Anglican missionaries
Anglican missionaries in India
Anglican bishops of Assam
Anglican bishops of Calcutta
20th-century Anglican archbishops
20th-century Anglican bishops in India